"Something Against You" is the seventh episode of the twelfth season of the American television medical drama Grey's Anatomy, and the 252nd episode overall. It aired November 12, 2015 on ABC in the United States. The episode was written by Andy Reaser and directed by Geary McLeod. On its initial airing the episode was watched by 8.02 million viewers and opened up to mixed reviews from television critics with praise going to the performance of Ellen Pompeo and Kevin McKidd and the focus brought on their characters while criticism was faced by the writers for the storylines in particular the arcs involving Sarah Drew and Jesse Williams's and Samantha Sloyan's characters.

Meredith Grey (Pompeo) and Jo Wilson (Camilla Luddington) struggle to help a long term patient needing a transplant. Tensions between Callie Torres (Sara Ramirez) and Meredith rise, and her professional judgment was clouded because of her feelings for Penelope Blake (Sloyan). Jackson Avery (Williams) and April Kepner (Drew) try to work on their marriage and Maggie Pierce has a tough time dealing with the new cardio attending Nathan Riggs (Martin Henderson). Alex Karev (Justin Chambers) teaches the intern about “doc-knockers” while Arizona Robbins (Jessica Capshaw) looks to get back in the dating pool. Amongst all of that, Owen Hunt's (McKidd) past came back to haunt him causing a PTSD relapse.

Plot
Meredith takes Richard’s advice about working with Penny, but she starts taking it too easy on Penny when a longtime elderly patient comes in for a kidney transplant. A large osteosarcoma is found on his skull, which halts the transplant until Jo realizes that the kidney donor can essentially remove the cancerous tumor by also donating a skull.

Bailey and Ben begin to squabble about Jackson still living with them, so Bailey withholds sex until Ben kicks him out. Maggie learns that Bailey hired Dr. Nathan Riggs, a new cardio attending, without consulting her first, which angers her and also Owen, who seems to have a past with him.

Callie keeps trying to talk to Meredith about neglecting her responsibility to teach Penny; however, Penny stands up for herself by telling Callie to let her fight her own battles and by telling Meredith to be hard on her and teach her like she should so she can learn.

Alex teaches the interns about “doc-knockers” and Arizona—desperate to start dating again—winds up with Richard as her wingman at trivia night.

Production

Reception

Broadcast

"Something Against You" was originally broadcast on November 12, 2015 in the United States on American Broadcasting Company (ABC) in the United States. On its initial release the episode was watched by a total of 8.02 million viewers and scored a 2.2/7 in the key 18-49 demographic in the Nielsen ratings, which was a decrease from the previous episode "The Me Nobody Knows" watched by 8.50 million viewers and received a 2.3/8 ratings/share.

Critical reception

The episode received mixed reviews from television critics, with Ellen Pompeo, Kevin McKidd and James Pickens Jr garnering praise. The storylines including characters Jackson Avery and April Kepner faced criticism, and the reception for Samantha Sloyan's character Penelope Blake was negative as well.

References

External links
 

Grey's Anatomy (season 12) episodes
2015 American television episodes